Joe Carlo Sclafani (born April 22, 1990) is an American former professional baseball infielder. He was drafted by the Houston Astros in the 14th round in 2012.

Amateur career
Sclafani played college baseball at Dartmouth College from 2009 to 2012. He played in 172 games, hitting .326/.408/.490 with 11 home runs and an Ivy League record 19 triples.

Professional career
Sclafani was drafted by the Houston Astros in the 14th round of the 2012 MLB draft. He signed with the Astros and made his professional debut with the Tri-City ValleyCats. In 2013, he started with the Quad Cities River Bandits and was promoted to the Lancaster JetHawks during the season. In 2014, Sclafani started with the Double-A Corpus Christi Hooks and was promoted to the Triple-A Oklahoma City RedHawks. In 2015, Sclafani spent time with the Hooks and Fresno Grizzlies. He was invited to major league spring training for the 2016 season but was released on March 31, 2016.

Post-baseball career
In June 2016, Sclafani joined the Toronto Blue Jays player development department as an assistant. Sclafani was promoted to a coordinator for the 2018 season and became the Assistant Director of player development in January 2019. On January 27, 2022, Sclafani was promoted to the title of Director of Player Development.

References

External links

Dartmouth Big Green bio

1990 births
Living people
Adelaide Bite players
Baseball players from New York (state)
Baseball shortstops
Baseball second basemen
Baseball third basemen
Corpus Christi Hooks players
Fresno Grizzlies players
Greeneville Astros players
Lancaster JetHawks players
Oklahoma City RedHawks players
Quad Cities River Bandits players
Sportspeople from Brooklyn
Baseball players from New York City
Tri-City ValleyCats players
United States national baseball team players
2015 WBSC Premier12 players
American expatriate baseball players in Australia